Rick Cuttell (born 14 January 1950) is a Canadian former athlete. He competed in the men's high jump at the 1972 Summer Olympics.

References

External links
 

1950 births
Living people
Athletes (track and field) at the 1972 Summer Olympics
Canadian male high jumpers
Olympic track and field athletes of Canada
Athletes from London, Ontario
Athletes (track and field) at the 1970 British Commonwealth Games
Athletes (track and field) at the 1975 Pan American Games
Pan American Games medalists in athletics (track and field)
Pan American Games bronze medalists for Canada
Medalists at the 1975 Pan American Games
Commonwealth Games competitors for Canada
20th-century Canadian people
21st-century Canadian people